Phu Pha Man National Park is a national park in Thailand's Khon Kaen and Loei provinces. This forested park is home to caves, waterfalls and steep cliffs.

Geography
The park's area is 218,750 rai ~ .

Attractions
Other park caves feature stalagmite and stalactite formations. The Lai Thaeng cave hosts rock paintings dating back up to 2,000 years.

The black rock Pha Nok Khao cliff rises above the Phong river.

Flora and fauna
The park's forest types are mostly evergreen and mixed deciduous. Plant life includes rattan, orchid and cogon grass. Park animals include wild boar, barking deer, monitor lizard and pangolin.

See also
List of national parks of Thailand
List of Protected Areas Regional Offices of Thailand

References

National parks of Thailand
Geography of Khon Kaen province
Tourist attractions in Khon Kaen province
Geography of Loei province
Tourist attractions in Loei province